4 de Abril Futebol Clube do Cuando Cubango, simply 4 de Abril is an Angolan sports club from the city of Menongue, in the  southern province of Kuando Kubango.

The club is named after and in honor of April 4 2002, the day when the Angolan government and the rebels of UNITA signed a memorandum of understanding, as an addendum to the Lusaka Protocol that ended 27 years of a civil war that erupted right after the declaration of Angola's independence in 1975. The day has been declared as the Day of Peace in Angola and a national holiday.

In 2015, the team finished 2nd in its series at the Gira Angola, Angola's second division championship and won a 2-leg playoff against the 2nd-ranked of the other Gira Angola series to secure a spot at the 2016 Girabola.

Achievements
Angolan League: 0

Angolan Cup: 0

Angolan SuperCup: 0

Gira Angola: 0

Recent seasons
4 de Abril FC's season-by-season performance since 2011:

 PR = Preliminary round, 1R = First round, GS = Group stage, R32 = Round of 32, R16 = Round of 16, QF = Quarter-finals, SF = Semi-finals

League & Cup Positions

Players and staff

Staff

Players

Manager history

 João Machado (2013–2016)

See also
Girabola (2016)
Gira Angola (2014), (2015)

References

External links
 2016 squad at girabola.com
 Girabola.com Profile

Football clubs in Angola
Sports clubs in Angola